Charles Frederick Leonard Jr. (February 23, 1913 – February 18, 2006) was an American pentathlete and a major general in the United States Army.

Leonard won the silver medal in the 1936 Olympic Pentathlon.

Charles Leonard's brother, William N. Leonard (1916–2005), was a World War II fighter ace. They were buried together in Arlington National Cemetery.

References

External links
 New York Times obituary
 Charles Frederick Leonard, Jr. at ArlingtonCemetery.net, an unofficial website
 

1913 births
2006 deaths
American pentathletes
United States Army personnel of World War II
United States Army personnel of the Korean War
United States Army generals
United States Military Academy alumni
United States Military Academy faculty
Olympic silver medalists for the United States in modern pentathlon
American male modern pentathletes
Modern pentathletes at the 1936 Summer Olympics
Medalists at the 1936 Summer Olympics